The 10th Secretariat of the Lao People's Revolutionary Party, officially the Secretariat of the 10th National Congresss of the Lao People's Revolutionary Party, was elected at the 1st Plenary Session of the 10th Central Committee in the immediate aftermath of the 10th National Congress in 2016.

Members

References

Specific

Bibliography
Articles and journals:
 

10th Secretariat of the Lao People's Revolutionary Party
2016 establishments in Laos
2021 disestablishments in Laos